Tadten is a village in the district of Neusiedl am See in Burgenland in Austria.

Tadten is a wine growing village with 1,234 inhabitants and lies at the transition from the Seewinkel region to the Hungarian puszta. In 1357 Tadten, then called "Tetun", was mentioned in a conflict of possession by the Raab chapter. The first settlement dates back to the 2nd century BC. The village has been destroyed several times by the Turks and Kurruzzen. In the 17th century Tadten came into the possession of the Esterhazy family. A Roman Catholic church was built in 1804 under Count Esterhazy. The church was enlargened in 1954 to its present size. 
 
120 m Elevation
1355 Inhabitants

Tadten national park village 
The area south of the village up to the state border at the artificial channel  is covered by marshy meadows of the  landscape.

References

Cities and towns in Neusiedl am See District